Leland Hotel may refer to:

Leland Hotel (Springfield, Illinois), historic hotel
Leland Hotel (Richmond, Indiana), listed on the NRHP in Wayne County, Indiana
The Leland Hotel (Detroit), listed on the NRHP in Michigan
a hotel at/near the Pike Place Market in Seattle, Washington